Osama Omari (born 10 January 1992 in Syria) is a Syrian footballer. He currently plays at Al-Jaish.

International career

International goals
Scores and results list Syria's goal tally first.

References

External links
 
 Profile Goal.com

1992 births
Living people
Syrian footballers
Association football midfielders
Sportspeople from Damascus
Al-Wahda SC (Syria) players
Qatar SC players
Al Kharaitiyat SC players
Qatar Stars League players
Qatari Second Division players
Syria international footballers
2019 AFC Asian Cup players
Syrian expatriate footballers
Syrian expatriate sportspeople in Qatar
Expatriate footballers in Qatar
Syrian Premier League players